Frederick Hamilton "Rick" Hauck (pronounced "Howk"; born April 11, 1941) is a retired captain in the United States Navy, a former fighter pilot and NASA astronaut.  He piloted Space Shuttle mission STS-7 and commanded STS-51-A and STS-26.

Personal data
He was born April 11, 1941, in Long Beach, California, but considers Winchester, Massachusetts and Washington, D.C. to be his hometowns. His parents were the late Captain and Mrs. Phillip F. Hauck. His maternal grandfather, Olaf M. Hustvedt, was a United States Navy vice admiral who commanded battleships during World War II. Hauck is married to Susan Cameron Bruce.

Education
 1958: Graduated from St. Albans School in Washington, D.C.
 1962: Received a Bachelor of Science degree in Physics from Tufts University. While attending Tufts he joined the Delta Upsilon fraternity.
 1966: Received a Master of Science degree in Nuclear Engineering from the Massachusetts Institute of Technology
 1971: Graduated U.S. Naval Test Pilot School

Military experience
Hauck, a Naval ROTC student at Tufts University, was commissioned upon graduation in 1962 and reported to the destroyer , where he served 20 months as communications officer and Combat Information Center officer. In 1964, he attended the U.S. Naval Postgraduate School, Monterey, California, for studies in mathematics and physics and for a brief time in 1965 studied the Russian language at the Defense Language Institute in Monterey. Selected for the Navy's Advanced Science Program, he received a master's degree in Nuclear Engineering from Massachusetts Institute of Technology the next year.

He commenced flight training at the Naval Air Station Pensacola, Florida in 1966, and was designated a Naval Aviator, receiving his aviator wings in 1968. As a pilot with Attack Squadron 35 he deployed to the Western Pacific with Carrier Air Wing Fifteen aboard the aircraft carrier , flying 114 combat and combat support missions in the A-6 Intruder. In August 1970, Hauck joined Attack Squadron 42 as a visual weapons delivery instructor in the A-6 Intruder. Selected for test pilot training, he reported to the U.S. Naval Test Pilot School at NAS Patuxent River, Maryland in 1971. A 3-year tour in the Naval Air Test Center's Carrier Suitability Branch of the Flight Test Division followed. During this period, Hauck served as a project test pilot for automatic carrier landing systems in the RA-5 Vigilante, A-6 Intruder, A-7 Corsair II, F-4 Phantom and F-14 Tomcat aircraft and was team leader for the Navy Board of Inspection and Survey aircraft carrier trials of the F-14. In 1974, he reported as operations officer to commander, Carrier Air Wing Fourteen aboard . On two cruises he flew the A-6, A-7, and F-14 during both day and night carrier operations. He reported to Attack Squadron 145 as Executive Officer in February 1977.

In May 1989 he became director, Navy Space Systems Division, in the Office of the Chief of Naval Operations. In this capacity he held budgeting responsibility for the Navy's space programs. Captain Hauck left military active duty on June 1, 1990.

NASA experience
NASA selected Hauck as an astronaut candidate in January 1978. He was assistant Crimson team CAPCOM for the first Space Shuttle mission re-entry. His first spaceflight was as pilot for STS-7, the seventh flight of the Space Shuttle, which launched from Kennedy Space Center, Florida, on June 18, 1983. The crew included Robert Crippen (spacecraft commander), and three mission specialists, John Fabian, Sally Ride, and Norm Thagard. This was the second flight for the orbiter Challenger and the first mission with a 5-person crew. During the mission, the STS-7 crew deployed satellites for Canada (ANIK-C2) and Indonesia (Palapa B-1); operated the Canadian-built Remote Manipulator System (RMS) to perform the first deployment and retrieval exercise (with the Shuttle Pallet Satellite (SPAS-01)); and with Crippen conducted the first piloting of the orbiter in close proximity to a free-flying satellite (SPAS-01). Mission duration was 147 hours before landing on a lakebed runway at Edwards Air Force Base, California, on June 24, 1983.

Hauck was spacecraft commander for the second mission of Discovery on mission STS-51-A, which launched on November 8, 1984. His crew included David M. Walker (astronaut) (pilot), and three mission specialists, Joseph Allen, Anna Fisher, and Dale Gardner. During the mission, the crew deployed two satellites, Telesat Canada's Anik D-2, and Hughes' LEASAT-1 (Syncom IV-1). In the first space salvage mission in history, the crew also retrieved for return to Earth the Palapa B-2 and Westar VI satellites. STS-51-A completed 127 orbits of the Earth before landing at Kennedy Space Center, Florida, on November 16, 1984.

In March 1985 Captain Hauck became the Astronaut Office project officer for the integration of the liquid-fueled Shuttle-Centaur upper-stage rocket. In May 1985 he was named commander of the Centaur-boosted Ulysses solar probe mission, STS-61-F (sponsored by the European Space Agency).  It was set to launch in a tight launch window in May 1986.  After the Challenger accident this mission was postponed, and the Shuttle-Centaur project was terminated.

In August 1986, Captain Hauck was appointed NASA associate administrator for external relations, the policy advisor to the NASA Administrator for congressional, public, international, inter-governmental, and educational affairs. He resumed his astronaut duties at the Johnson Space Center in early February 1987.

Hauck was spacecraft commander of Discovery on STS-26, the first flight to be flown after the Challenger accident. The mission launched on September 29, 1988. The flight crew included the pilot, Richard Covey, and three mission specialists, David Hilmers, Mike Lounge, and George Nelson. During the four-day mission, the crew deployed the Tracking and Data Relay Satellite (TDRS-C) and operated eleven mid-deck experiments. Discovery completed 64 orbits of the Earth before landing at Edwards Air Force Base, California, on October 3, 1988.

Hauck has logged over 5,500 flight hours, 436 in space.

Post-NASA experience
In October 1990, he joined AXA Space (formerly INTEC) as president and chief operating officer, and on January 1, 1993, assumed responsibilities as chief executive officer. AXA Space is a world leader in providing property and casualty insurance for the risk of launching and operating satellites. He retired from AXA Space in April 2005.

Memberships, boards, and panels
 Fellow, Society of Experimental Test Pilots
 Fellow, American Institute of Aeronautics and Astronautics (AIAA)
 Board of Trustees, Tufts University (1987-)
 Board of Governors, St. Albans School (1989–95)
 Association of Space Explorers (Vice President, 1991–93; Board of Directors, 2000-)
 Technical Advisor to The Synthesis Group on America's Space Exploration Initiative (1990–91)
 Commercial Space Transportation Advisory Committee (COMSTAC), United States Department of Transportation (1992–99)
 Chair, COMSTAC Task Group on Russian Entry into Commercial Space Markets (1992)
 NASA Commercial Programs Advisory Committee (1991)
 Department of Commerce U.S. Space Commerce Mission to Russia (1992)
 NASA Mission Review Task Group (Space Salvage) (1992)
 General Dynamics Atlas Failure Review Oversight Boards (1992, 1993)
 U.S. Congress Office of Technology Assessment Advisory Panel on National Space Transportation Policy (1994–95)
 Chair, NASA External Independent Readiness Review Team for Second Hubble Space Telescope Servicing Mission (1995–97)
 National Research Council (NRC) Aeronautics and Space Engineering Board (1996- )
 NRC Committee on International Space Station Meteoroid/Debris Risk Management (1995–1996)
 Chair, NRC Committee on Space Shuttle Meteoroid/Debris Risk Management (1997)
 Boeing Space Launch Mission Assurance Review Team (1999)
 External Requirements Assessment Team for NASA 2nd Generation Reusable Launch Vehicle Program (2000- )
 Chair, NRC Committee on Precursor Measurements Necessary to Support Human Operations on the Surface of Mars (2001-)
 Executive Committee, Astronaut Scholarship Foundation
 Board of Directors, American Astronautical Society (AAS) (1997–2000)
 Chair, Arts and Sciences Board of Overseers, Tufts University (1997- )
 External Visiting Committee, Dept. of Aeronautics and Astronautics, Stanford Univ. (2001)
 Member, Space Foundation Board of Directors (2005- )

Special honors
 Two Defense Distinguished Service Medals
 the Defense Superior Service Medal
 the Legion of Merit
 the Distinguished Flying Cross
 the Air Medal (9)
 the Navy Commendation Medal with Gold Star and Combat V
 the NASA Distinguished Service Medal
 the NASA Medal for Outstanding Leadership
 the NASA Space Flight Medal (3)
 Astronaut Hall of Fame
 the Navy's Outstanding Test Pilot Award
 the Presidential Cost Saving Commendation
 the AIAA Haley Space Flight Award
 Lloyd's of London Silver Medal for Meritorious Service
 two AAS Flight Achievement Awards
 the Fédération Aéronautique Internationale (FAI) Yuri Gagarin Gold Medal
 the FAI Komarov Diploma (2)
 the Tufts University Presidential Medal
 the Tufts University Light on the Hill Award
 the Delta Upsilon Distinguished Alumnus Award
 Who's Who in America

References

External links

 Spacefacts biography of Frederick Hauck
 

1941 births
Living people
United States Navy astronauts
United States Astronaut Hall of Fame inductees
People from Long Beach, California
People from Winchester, Massachusetts
People from Washington, D.C.
St. Albans School (Washington, D.C.) alumni
Tufts University School of Arts and Sciences alumni
MIT School of Engineering alumni
United States Naval Test Pilot School alumni
United States Navy captains
United States Naval Aviators
American test pilots
Engineers from California
American nuclear engineers
21st-century American physicists
United States Navy personnel of the Vietnam War
Recipients of the Legion of Merit
Recipients of the Distinguished Flying Cross (United States)
Recipients of the Air Medal
Recipients of the Defense Superior Service Medal
Recipients of the NASA Distinguished Service Medal
Recipients of the Defense Distinguished Service Medal
American chief executives
American chief operating officers
Space Shuttle program astronauts
Military personnel from California
Military personnel from Massachusetts